Brigitte Sleeking (born 19 March 1998) is a Dutch water polo player for Greek powerhouse Olympiacos Piraeus and the Dutch national team.

She participated at the 2018 Women's European Water Polo Championship.

References

External links
 

1998 births
Living people
Dutch female water polo players
Olympiacos Women's Water Polo Team players
Expatriate water polo players
Dutch expatriate sportspeople in Spain
Water polo players at the 2020 Summer Olympics
Olympic water polo players of the Netherlands
World Aquatics Championships medalists in water polo
21st-century Dutch women
Dutch expatriate sportspeople in Greece